The golden-browed chlorophonia (Chlorophonia callophrys) is a species of bird in the family Fringillidae. It is found in Costa Rica and Panama. It is uncommon in subtropical or tropical moist montane forest above  elevation.

Description
A brightly coloured bird, the golden-browed chlorophonia is distinctive within its range. The male is bright green above and yellow below, with a wide golden-yellow eyebrow stripe and a violet-blue cap. It has a narrow blue eye ring and a thin blue line extending from its nape to its breast. The female is similar, but without the golden brown and yellow breast; these are both replaced with green. They average  in length.

It has a soft whistling call: wheeeeuuu.

Folklore
In Costa Rica, its local common name is the rualdo. There is a legend of how this bird used to have a wonderful singing voice, but offered that to the volcano Poás to prevent a young woman from having to be sacrificed, thus keeping the volcano from erupting.

References

External links

 
 
 
 
 Video Golden-browed Chlorophonia (Chlorophonia callophrys)

golden-browed chlorophonia
Birds of Costa Rica
Birds of Panama
golden-browed chlorophonia
Taxonomy articles created by Polbot